Trishala, also known as Videhadatta, Priyakarini, or Trishala Mata (Mother Trishala), was the mother of Mahavira, the 24th Tirthankara of Jainism, and wife of the Jain monarch, Siddhartha of Kundagrama, of present-day Bihar. She finds mention in the Jain texts.

Life
Trishala was born as a princess in the royal Licchavi Empire. Jain text, Uttarapurāṇa details the life of all Tirthankaras and other Salakapurusa. It is mentioned in the text that King Chetaka of Vaishali had ten sons and seven daughters. His eldest daughter Priyakarini (Trishala) was married to Siddartha. As per Indologist Hermann Jacobi, Vardhaman Mahavira's mother Trishala was sister of King Chetaka. His third wife, Kshema, was a daughter of the chief of the Madra clan of Punjab. Trishala had seven sisters, one of whom was initiated into the Jain monastic order while the other six married famous kings, including Bimbisara of Magadha. She and her husband Siddhartha were followers of Parshva, the 23rd Tirthankara. According to Jain texts, Trishala carried her son for nine months and seven and a half days during the 6th century BC. However, Svetambaras generally believe that he was conceived by Devananda, the wife of a Brahmin Rishabhadatta and the fetus was transferred to Trishala's womb by Indra because all Tirthankaras have to be Kshatriyas. All this is mentioned in the Svetambara text, Kalpa sutra, which is primarily a biography of the  Tirthankaras.

Auspicious dreams

According to the Jain scriptures, the mother of Tirthankaras see a number of auspicious dreams when the embryo is enliven through the descent of the life (soul) in the mortal body. This is celebrated as Garbha Kalyanaka. According to the Digambara sect, the number of dreams is 16. While the Śvētāmbara sect believe them to be only fourteen. After seeing these dreams, she woke her husband King Siddhartha and told him about the dreams. The next day Siddhartha summoned the scholars of the court and asked them to explain the meaning of the dreams. According to the scholars, these dreams meant that the child would be born very strong, courageous, and full of virtue.

 Dream of an elephant (Airavata)
 Dream of a bull
 Dream of a lion
 Dream of Laxmi
 Dream of flowers
 Dream of a full moon
 Dream of the sun
 Dream of a large banner
 Dream of a silver urn (Kalasha)
 Dream of a lake filled with lotuses
 Dream of a milky-white sea
 Dream of a celestial vehicle (Vimana)
 Dream of a heap of gems
 Dream of a fire without smoke
 Dream of a pair of fish (Digambara)
 Dream of a throne (Digambara)

Legacy
Today members of the Jain religion celebrate the event of the Dreams. This event is called Swapna Darshan and is often part of "Ghee Boli".

The parents of Tirthankaras and their mothers in particular are worshipped among Jains and are frequently depicted in paintings and sculpture.

See also

 Marudevi

References

Citations

Sources 
 

 FreeIndia.org
 JainWorld
 Trishla Mata Temple Mahavirpuram

External links
  Kalpa Sutra text (1884 English translation)

Indian female royalty
6th-century BC Indian Jains
Indian queen consorts
Ancient Indian women
Mahavira